Bohus are a furniture retailer in Norway.

It was founded in 1976 under the name Samarbeidende Møbelhandlere ('Cooperating Furniture Retailers'). The current name is a pun using the words bo and hus, Norwegian for "live" and "house" respectively, inspired by the famous German art school Bauhaus. The name is also shared by a Swedish fortress, on Norwegian land until the Treaty of Roskilde in 1658.

The chain operates 60 stores. The administrative headquarters are at Økern, Oslo.

References

Furniture retailers
Retail companies of Norway
Companies based in Oslo
Retail companies established in 1976
Norwegian companies established in 1976